Martín Seefeld (born 20 November 1960 in Olivos, Vicente López Partido, Buenos Aires, Argentina) is an Argentine actor, television host, television producer and radio host.

Biography 
Martín Seefeld was born on 20 November 1960 in Olivos, Vicente López Partido, Buenos Aires, Argentina and grew up in the Buenos Aires neighborhood of Don Torcuato, Buenos Aires, Argentina. Martín Seefeld started studying theater at the age of 20. At 29 he started working in the manufacture of leather jackets and the organization of events.

Personal life 
In the year 1984, Martín Seefeld married the model and actress, Raquel Mancini. The couple divorced in the year 1989. Martín Seefeld and Valeria Giuliani met in 1989 when he was 29 years old and she 22 years old. In the year 1990, Martín Seefeld married Valeria Giuliani. In 2003, the couple's first child, a girl, was born whom, they called Lola Seefeld. In 2005, the couple's second child, a boy, was born whom, they called Pedro Seefeld.

Filmography

Television

Movies

Theater

Television programs

References

1960 births
Living people
People from Vicente López Partido
Argentine people of Galician descent
Argentine people of German-Jewish descent
Argentine male actors